Chester Middlebrook Pierce ( – ) was an American psychiatrist who was a tenured professor of education and psychiatry at Harvard Medical School. He was the first African-American full professor at Massachusetts General Hospital and was past-president of the American Board of Psychiatry and Neurology and the American Orthopsychiatric Association. He was a fellow in the American Academy of Arts and Sciences. He was a senior consultant for the acclaimed educational children's television series Sesame Street. He also coined and developed the term "microaggression".

Biography
Chester Pierce was born on March 4, 1927, in Glen Cove, New York. At the time, only 10% of the 8,000 residents were African Americans. Pierce became the first African American president of his high school. In 1948, he received his A.B. degree from Harvard College and in 1952 he received his M.D. degree from the Harvard Medical School. After medical school, Pierce trained as a psychiatrist in Cincinnati, Ohio.

Pierce was the first African American college football athlete to perform on the playing field of a predominantly-white university versus an all-white team below the Mason–Dixon. Harvard's opponent was University of Virginia, October 11, 1947, before a crowd of 22,000.

Pierce died on September 23, 2016 at age 89.

Career
Pierce published over 180 books, articles, and reviews. His work mostly surrounds areas of racism, societal tensions, sports medicine, and the media. He was a member of the Institute of Medicine at the National Academy of Sciences as well as at the American Academy of Arts and Science. Pierce guest lectured at over 100 universities in the United States. Although Pierce retired as a psychiatrist in 1997, one of his most recent accomplishments came in 2002 when he organized an "African Diaspora" conference that brought psychiatrists from all around the globe to discuss issues and problems. Because of his efforts, the MGH Division of International Psychiatry was founded in 2003. The Harvard Foundation also commissioned a portrait of Pierce, which now hangs in the residence hall in which he lived as an undergraduate at Harvard.

Pierce was a Commander in the U.S. Navy and later a senior consultant to multiple different health-related organizations, and part of 22 editorial boards. He participated in the World Association of Social Psychiatry. Much of his time was spent working with organizations that help to promote human rights, conservation, and youth education. He was a consultant for the Children's Television Network, the Surgeon General of the U.S. Air Force, the US Arctic Research Commission, the Peace Corps, and the National Aeronautics and Space Administration.

Pierce was a professor of education and psychiatry at Harvard Medical School. He became the first African-American full professor at the Massachusetts General Hospital. Pierce was a past president of the American Board of Psychiatry and Neurology in the American Orthopsychiatric Association and later a fellow in the American Academy of Arts and Sciences. From 2001-2004 he was on the Carter Center Mental Health Task force and a founding president of the Black Psychiatrists of America. During that time he was also the National Chairperson of the Child Development Associate Consortium. He spent much of his career as a Senior Psychiatrist at Massachusetts General Hospital, and worked as a psychiatrist at the Massachusetts Institute of Technology for 25 years. Dr.Pierce also worked in some capacity with the MK ULTRA program  .

Pierce and Gail Allen defined childism as a fundamental form of oppression of children.

Works about
Pierce was the subject of the book Race and Excellence: My Dialogue with Chester Pierce, by Ezra E. H. Griffith, published in 1998.

References

 
 
 West, L. J. (1983), CHESTER MIDDLEBROOK PIERCE, M.D., Sc.D. American Journal of Orthopsychiatry, 53: 196–200. doi: 10.1111/j.1939-0025.1983.tb03364.x

American psychiatrists
African-American psychologists
20th-century African-American academics
20th-century American academics
Harvard Medical School faculty
Massachusetts General Hospital faculty
Members of the National Academy of Medicine
Harvard Medical School alumni
Harvard College alumni
Harvard Crimson football players
Players of American football from New York (state)
People from Glen Cove, New York
1927 births
2016 deaths